Puerto Rico Highway 2 (PR-2) is a road in Puerto Rico that connects the cities of San Juan and Ponce. At 156 miles (230 km) long, it is Puerto Rico's longest singled-signed highway.

The road runs counter-clockwise from San Juan to Ponce. PR-2 runs parallel to the northern coast of Puerto Rico (west of San Juan), then parallel to the west coast from near Aguadilla running south through Mayagüez. Shortly after Mayagüez, the road runs somewhat inland (through Hormigueros, San Germán and Sabana Grande) until it reaches the southern coast of Puerto Rico at Yauco, and continues to run parallel the southern shore as it approaches Ponce from the west. In addition to Arecibo, Aguadilla, and Mayagüez, the road runs through various other cities including Guaynabo, Bayamón, San Germán and Yauco. In some sections the road is a four-lane highway while in other sections the road is either a six-lane or eight-lane highway.

The section of PR-2 from Ponce to the PR-22 interchange in Hatillo forms part of the unsigned Interstate Highway PRI-2.  PRI-2 originally included the entire route of PR-2 until the construction of PR-22, which has since been assigned the PRI-2 designation from its western terminus in Hatillo to its eastern terminus in San Juan.

Route description

San Juan to Hatillo
Puerto Rico Highway 2 starts off in San Juan as an 8-lane road and heads west roughly parallel to the northern shore of the island. It makes its way through the Caparra section of San Juan, intersecting with Route 22, which provides access to San Juan's Santurce ward and to the cities of Carolina and Caguas. Heading west, PR-2 traverses the cities of Guaynabo and Bayamon as a heavily used road. In addition to numerous residential communities, PR-2 also provides access to malls, movie theaters, restaurants, hospitals, and various colleges and universities, among other facilities in this area.

The road then serves the towns of Toa Baja, Dorado, and Vega Baja and Vega Alta.  In these areas the road experiences heavy traffic. Continuing west, Puerto Rico Highway 2 next serves the industrial towns of Manatí and Barceloneta providing access to several pharmaceutical companies, among other sources of employment outside the agricultural sector. In this area the road is also the main road to intersections leading to the beaches of Los Tubos, Mar Chiquita, Tortuguero, Puerto de las Vacas, and Las Criollas.

The next major city on the road is Arecibo. On PR-2, in the eastern part of Arecibo is the longest bridge in Puerto Rico. PR-2 also intersects with PR-10 for access to the interior of the island as well as Ponce on the southern shore. After Arecibo the road then makes its way to the town of Hatillo where it meets with the current western terminus of the new PR-22 expressway.

Hatillo to Mayagüez
West of its interchange with PR-22 in Hatillo, PR-2 becomes a primary road and meets several important highways that serve the center of the island such as PR-119, PR-110 and PR-112. This stretch of the highway contains a multitude of traffic lights. Following Hatillo the roads traverses the towns of Camuy, Quebradillas and Isabela. At Isabela, PR-2 provides access to roads leading to various beaches, including Blue Hole, Guajataca, and Jobos.

In the city of Aguadilla, PR-2 turns south at its intersection with PR-107, on its course towards the western city and seaport of Mayagüez. In this area Puerto Rico Highway 2 provides access to Aguadilla's Rafael Hernandez airport, as well as to various area beach resorts. The trip from Aguadilla to Mayagüez takes about 30 minutes, and PR-2 has fewer traffic lights in this stretch of the road than those experienced so far anywhere from its San Juan terminus starting point.

Mayagüez/Hormigueros
PR-2 is a major 6-lane highway in Mayagüez, which is one of the major cities in Puerto Rico. It intersect with PR-102 and PR-64, which serve as by-pass routes. The farm to market PR-102 highway also has access to PR-2 through the new Puerto Rico Highway 63, another important intersection of Puerto Rico Highway 2. As it traverses the city of Mayaguez, PR-2 is the main road for access to the University of Puerto Rico at Mayagüez and the Mayagüez Zoo. Also, further south, PR-2 provides access to the Mayagüez Mall, which is Puerto Rico's third largest shopping center and several medical facilities. The road then continues south through the municipality of Hormigueros.

Hormigueros to Ponce
Heading southeastward passed Hormigueros, PR-2 becomes a four-lane controlled-access freeway in its way to Ponce. It has several exits in the municipalities of San Germán, Sabana Grande, Guánica, Yauco, Guayanilla and Peñuelas. In this agricultural section, PR-2 provides access to some of Puerto Rico's southern beaches, such as Boquerón.  The road is also within a few minutes' drive from the Guánica Dry Forest state park.

As the road makes its way through the hills of Peñuelas' barrio Tallaboa, the ruins of the abandoned 1970s CORCO oil refinery as well as its PPG supplier are visible to the right. Puerto Rico Highway 2 provides access to many rural communities in this stretch of the road.  As it approaches Ponce, PR-2 becomes an 8-lane divided highway again. Before its entry to the municipality of Ponce, Peñón de Ponce is a prominent promontory to the left of the road while El Tuque beach will be visible to the right. There are also various hotels in the area. In the Las Cucharas section of this area, there is also a good selection of restaurants by the shore, serving mostly seafood. Construction of the Ponce-to-Peñuelas stretch of PR-2 was completed in the early 1960s after construction work that began with the building of bridges over Río Matilde, Río Portugués, and Río Bucaná.

Ponce

The road is an 8-lane divided highway in its western approach to Ponce. After its intersection with the PR-52 expressway, the road becomes a 6-lane at-grade roadway in the city of Ponce. It provides access to barrios Canas, Playa, Canas Urbano, San Antón, Bucaná, and Sabanetas.  It provides access to four of Ponce's beaches, to the Damas and Dr. Pila hospitals, to various shopping plazas including the Plaza del Caribe Mall and Centro del Sur Mall, the Puerto Rico Judicial Center, the University of Puerto Rico at Ponce, the Mercedita Airport, and numerous restaurants and other facilities. The PR-2 segment corresponding to the city of Ponce was built in the late 1940s and is known as the "Ponce By-Pass", since it was used to "bypass" the urban and commercial city center when traveling due east from western towns such as Guayanilla, Yauco,  San Germán, and Mayagüez, to towns in eastern Puerto Rico such as Salinas, Guayama, Cayey, Caguas, and San Juan. The section of PR-2 between Guayanilla and Ponce opened in 1965.

As the road makes its way through the city of Ponce, it is also known as the Ponce Bypass. The Ponce Bypass intersects with seven major roads: PR-2R (Carretera Pámpanos), with access to the Estadio Francisco Montaner; PR-585 (Avenida Eduardo Ruberté), which leads to barrio Playa; PR-123 (Avenida Hostos), leading to the Museo de Arte de Ponce and historic downtown Ponce; PR-12 (Avenida Santiago de los Caballeros), leading to La Guancha Boardwalk and the Port of the Americas; and PR-163 (Avenida Julio Enrique Monagas)  leading to Julio Enrique Monagas Family Park and Museo de Arte de Ponce. The road's last intersection in Ponce as well as its western terminus is at its intersection with PR-133 westbound (Calle Comercio, a.k.a. Avenida Ednita Nazario) and PR-1 eastbound (Avenida La Ceiba). PR-133 heads west to Ceiba Tree Park and PR-1 heads east to Mercedita Airport. After this dual intersection at PR-133/PR-1 the road seamlessly becomes a 4-lane thoroughfare called Miguel A. Pou Boulevard, the city's main artery into the Ponce Historic Zone.

Municipalities served
PR-2 runs through 26 municipalities. Cataño, Rincón, Cabo Rojo and Lajas are the only coastal municipalities in Puerto Rico (west of San Juan and Ponce) that PR-2 does not pass in the way from San Juan to Ponce, though PR-2 is less than one mile from the limits between Hormigueros and Cabo Rojo at its intersection with PR-100. PR-2 passes through a small segment of the municipality of Guánica, only slightly over a mile long. PR-2 also passes near Moca in the vicinity of Aguadilla, less than a mile away.

The following are the municipalities through which PR-2 runs, in counterclockwise from San Juan to Ponce:

 San Juan
 Guaynabo
 Bayamón
 Toa Baja
 Dorado
 Vega Alta
 Vega Baja
 Manatí
 Barceloneta
 Arecibo
 Hatillo
 Camuy
 Quebradillas
 Isabela
 Moca
 Aguadilla
 Aguada
 Añasco
 Mayagüez
 Hormigueros
 San Germán
 Sabana Grande
 Guánica
 Yauco
 Guayanilla
 Peñuelas
 Ponce

History
PR-2 has been in use for many decades. It was initially a 2-lane road. It experienced enhancements throughout the years. In the northern coast of the island, the need for a better road was addressed with the construction of PR-22, a new 4-lane road parallel to PR-2.

In the southern and southwestern part of the island, this need was addressed by improvements to the exiting PR-2 road, which was already a 4-lane road. In this stretch, during the mid 2000s to early 2010s, the Puerto Rico Department of Transportation and Public Works (DTOP) converted most segments of PR-2 between Mayagüez and Ponce into a limited access expressway.  The segment between Hormigueros and San German, in particular, suffered from several at-grade intersections that slowed down travel time considerably. In an effort to increase the controlled access, freeway-style character of the highway, all at-grade intersections were either replaced by overpasses or eliminated altogether. The last intersection to be converted was PR-2's intersection with PR-345 in Hormigueros.

As for the western section of PR-2, the DTOP has also eyed the stretch between Mayaguez to Aguadilla for conversion into a freeway. This would occur between the future western terminus of Puerto Rico Highway 22 in Aguadilla to the Mayaguez city limits. The PR-22 extension to Aguadilla was planned for completion in 2016, and freeway conversion of the Aguadilla-to-Mayaguez segment of PR-2 was slanted to begin shortly afterward.

Improvements and PR-22

Due to the high population density on the northern coast of Puerto Rico, a new, limited access expressway, PR-22 (also known as Autopista José de Diego), was built parallel to highway PR-2. The goal was to reduce congestion on highway PR-2. Highway PR-22 has several exits that provide access to highway PR-2. Highway PR-22 ends in the municipality of Hatillo, just west of the city of Arecibo. In Hatillo, highway PR-2 meets highway PR-22. During its entire length, from San Juan to Hatillo, the two highways run parallel with each other. Plans are in place to extend PR-22 to Aguadilla.

Major intersections

Related routes
Puerto Rico Highway 2R (abbreviated Ramal PR-2 or PR-2R) refers to several urban roads in Puerto Rico, located in Aguadilla, Mayagüez, and Ponce, which serve as business routes for PR-2.

Aguadilla spur

This short east–west segment, known as San Carlos Avenue, is the  main connection to both downtown Aguadilla and Aguadilla Mall from PR-2. It begins at an interchange with PR-2, immediately to the east is the mall. It then heads west through a curvy downhill slope, quickly arriving in the town square and intersecting with PR-111. It then immediately ends at PR-440 in front of the coastline. From the PR-2 interchange to the square it is divided, while the rest is a two way urban street.

Mayagüez loop

Historically was the right of way of PR-2 inside Mayagüez downtown before the construction of Avenida Eugenio María de Hostos. The entirety of its segment in Mayagüez was formerly known as Calle Post, until recently when it was renamed into two names, under the José Guillermo Rodríguez administration.  As the longest street in Mayagüez, served as main entrance to the center of the city and gave access to some communities as Colombia, Santurce, Belmonte, Cuesta de las Piedras, Río Cristal and Barriada Nadal (Poblado Sábalos).  Originally named by governor Regis Henri Post in 1909, it was recently renamed both honoring Alfonso Valdés Cobián and Ramón Emeterio Betances by disposition of the Municipal Legislative.  Currently the entire road was renumbered to PR-239.

The former street runs north–south for 5 miles and begins in a park at front of the University of Puerto Rico at Mayagüez on the intersection of PR-2, connecting with Puerto Rico Highway 65 just before crossing the Yagüez River. In this section is called now Alfonso Valdés Cobián Boulevard.  Going south the Yagüez River comes inside the downtown of Mayagüez city, crossing the Méndez Vigo (PR-106), Candelaria (PR-105), Nenadich, Hiram David Cabassa, PR-348, PR-380, and Carolina roads to finally ending at the PR-2 aside with Avenida Corazones in Sábalos ward. In this section is called now Ramón Emeterio Betances Street.

Ponce spur

Some publications call the northern portion of this road Calle Coto Canas.

Located entirely within Barrio Canas, PR-2R begins at PR-2 in the south, in the Pámpanos neighborhood and, as you head north, it passes the Paquito Montaner Stadium and the Juan Pachín Vicéns Auditorium, both to the left. PR-2R then passes Escuela Superior Vocacional (Vocational High School) to the right and Secretaría de Recreación y Deportes Francisco "Pancho" Coimbre to the left, where it intersects with PR-163 (Avenida Las Américas). The road then continues north for approximately another one-half mile before ending at PR-123 (Calle Villa Street). This northern terminus is located about 1.0 kilometer west of downtown Ponce. The entire length of PR-2R in Ponce is a two-lane road.

In the 1810s, today's PR-2R in Ponce was part of what was called "Camino de Tallaboa" (Road to Tallaboa), a road that since, at least, the 1810s led from the center of Ponce to Barrio Tallaboa in Peñuelas. The 1810s' Camino de Tallaboa consisted of three segments. The first segment was half a kilometer long and led from the center of Ponce in the east (Plaza Real) to a point west where today's Calle Villa intersects Calle Capitan Correa. That segment was called "Calle de la Villa" (Street to the Villa), for it led to the "Villa de Ponce" (the center of town) from points west. This segment is today (2019) part of PR-132, the road to Peñuelas. The second segment of Camino de Tallaboa was called "Carretera al Barrio de los Pámpanos", or just "Carretera a Pámpanos". It had its northern terminus at today's Calle Villa and headed southwest to barrio Pámpanos, a small community bound on the south by today's PR-2, on the east and north by today's Avenida Eduardo Ruberté, and in the west by the eastern banks of Río Matilde. Thus Carretera a Pámpanos had its southern terminus at today's PR-2 in Barrio Canas. This second/middle segment of Camino de Tallaboa is what is called today PR-2R.) The third and last segment of Camino de Tallaboa had its eastern terminus at Carretera Pámpanos and its western terminus in Peñuelas's Barrio Tallaboa. Between the late 1940s and 1965, this road was replaced by today's PR-2.

See also

 Interstate Highways in Puerto Rico
 List of highways in Ponce, Puerto Rico
 List of highways numbered 2
 List of streets in Ponce, Puerto Rico

Notes

References

External links

 Historia de las Carreteras de Puerto Rico. Retrieved July 30, 2009. 
 Roads in Porto Rico. By Manuel Victor Domenech (Former Commissioner of the Interior), in The Overland Monthly. Vol 73, No, 4; April, 1919. Page 321. Retrieved September 23, 2009.

002
02